Llanbadarn Fawr Community Council (Welsh - Cyngor Cymuned Llanbadarn Fawr) is the community council that administers the village of Llanbadarn Fawr.

The council elects fifteen representatives from two wards: Llanbadarn Fawr - Sulien (9) and Llanbadarn Fawr - Padarn (6).

At its annual meeting, held in May each year, the council appoints a Chairman and Vice Chairman. The current Chairman is Councillor Martin Davies (Independent).

Clockwise, from the north, it borders the communities of Y Faenor, Llanfarian and Aberystwyth.

Election history
Elections to Llanbadarn Fawr Community Council take place at the same time as other local government elections in Wales.

2022 Election
The last elections were held on 5 May 2022. As there were fewer candidates than seats, the councillors were elected without contest. The election resulted in 8 seats for independent councillors, 2 seats for Plaid Cymru, and 5 vacant seats.

2017 election
The 2017 elections were held on 3 May 2017. As there were fewer candidates than seats, the councillors were elected without contest.

As not all seats were filled at the 2017 election, Siôn Jobbins was voted to be coopted y the council.

2012 election
The 2012 elections were held on 3 May and resulted in Uncontested Elections for all fifteen members.

As there were two vacancies, one for each ward, the council voted to co-opt two independent members:David Greaney and Martin Davies (who had previously served as a councillor).

References
 
Llanbadarn Fawr Community Council website

Communities in Ceredigion